Word of Honor is a 2003 American drama television film directed by Robert Markowitz, based on the 1985 novel of the same name by Nelson DeMille. It stars Don Johnson, Jeanne Tripplehorn, Sharon Lawrence, John Heard and Arliss Howard. It aired on TNT on December 6, 2003.

Premise 
30 years after serving in Vietnam, an ex-Army Lieutenant is brought forward for war crimes.

Cast

Don Johnson as Lt. Benjamin Tyson
Jeanne Tripplehorn as Maj. Karen Harper
Sharon Lawrence as Marcy McClure Tyson
John Heard as Dr. Steven Brandt
Arliss Howard as J.D. Runnells
Peter MacNeill as Gen. Norm Van Arken
Peter Stebbings as Maj. Michael Taix
Jesse Johnson as a young Lt. Benjamin Tyson

Nominations
 Nominated for a Golden Reel Award for Best Sound Editing in Television Long Form - Sound Effects & Foley - 2004

External links
 

2003 television films
2003 films
2003 drama films
2000s English-language films
2000s legal drama films
2000s war drama films
American drama television films
American legal drama films
American war drama films
Films about the United States Army
Films about war crimes trials
Films based on American novels
Films directed by Robert Markowitz
Films scored by Gary Chang
Television films based on books
TNT Network original films
Vietnam War films
War television films
2000s American films